Argyrotaenia minisignaria is a species of moth of the family Tortricidae. It is found in the Dominican Republic and Jamaica.

Subspecies
Argyrotaenia minisignaria minisignaria (Dominican Republic)
Argyrotaenia minisignaria chalarostium Razowski & Becker, 2000 (Jamaica)

References

Moths described in 1999
minisignaria
Moths of the Caribbean